The 2012 Jacksonville State Gamecocks football team represented Jacksonville State University as a member of the Ohio Valley Conference (OVC) during the 2012 NCAA Division I FCS football season. Led by Jack Crowe in his 13th and final season as head coach, the Gamecocks compiled an overall record of 6–5 with a mark of 4–3 in conference play, placing fourth in the OVC. Jacksonville State played home games at Burgess–Snow Field at JSU Stadium in Jacksonville, Alabama.

Crowe was fired on November 30.

Schedule

Ranking movements

References

Jacksonville State
Jacksonville State Gamecocks football seasons
Jacksonville State Gamecocks football